Nick Best (born November 3, 1968) is an American professional strongman competitor and world champion powerlifter.

Powerlifting
Prior to competing in strongman, Best won the USAPL National Powerlifting Championships in the 125 kg class in 1996 and 1997, as well as the WDFPF World Powerlifting Championships in 1996.

Strongman
Best holds the International Federation of Strength Athletes world record for the 125 kg, 75 m Farmer's Walk, with a time of 47.3 seconds.

He won the All-American Strongman Challenge in 2010, his career best win. This victory qualified him for the 2010 Arnold Strongman Classic, he finished ninth overall in that contest.

He competed in the 2010 World's Strongest Man, his first time in the competition and qualified for the finals and finished in sixth place overall.

Best finished second at the Strongman Super Series Swedish Grand Prix on December 17, 2010, behind Brian Shaw.

He was placed second at the 2011 All-American Strongman Challenge on January 30, which earned him an invite to the 2011 Arnold Strongman Classic, where he took seventh place.

He competed in the 2011 World's Strongest Man contest but failed to qualify for the finals. Best also competed in the 2012 All-American Strongman Challenge and finished in third place overall.

Best was placed second at the Giants Live event in Melbourne, Australia on March 17, 2012, behind Mike Jenkins.

He set a joint world record in the hip lift event with Mike Jenkins with a lift of 1,150 kg. (2,535.3 pounds). This placing qualified Nick for the 2012 World's Strongest Man contest, he finished third in his heat and failed to qualify for the finals. In the television series, The Strongest Man in History, on the History channel, Best beat his previous record up to 1,266 kg (2,791 pounds).

He competed in the inaugural SCL North American Championships in Warwick, Ontario, Canada, on July 5–8, 2012, placing third overall.

Best finished second in the 2013 Giants Live Australia Grand Prix in Melbourne, Australia behind winner Derek Poundstone. This placing qualified Nick for the 2013 World's Strongest Man contest.

See also
 List of strongmen

References

American strength athletes
American powerlifters
1969 births
Living people
Sportspeople from Las Vegas